Qeshlaq (also Romanized as Qeshlāq) is a village in Parsinah Rural District, in the Central District of Sonqor County, Kermanshah Province, Iran. At the 2006 census, its population was 501, in 126 families.

References 

Populated places in Sonqor County